Moving Targets is a 2004 Hong Kong action crime film starring Nicholas Tse, Edison Chen, Simon Yam ,and Gillian Chung as the main leads. With Michelle Yim, Roy Chow, Lam Suet ,and Kent Tong in the main supporting roles. Directed, written ,and produced by Wong Jing, the film is based on the popular 1980 TVB drama series Police Cadet '84.

"Moving Targets" was released in Mainland China under the title "Young Detective 青年干探" with an estimated box office gross of ¥3,000,000 RMB. Movie rights in Mainland China was distributed by "Beijing Poly-bona Film Distribution Co., Ltd.".

Plot
Cheung Wai-kit (Nicholas Tse) and Ngai Fung "Fit Lo" (Edison Chen) are best friends and two of Hong Kong's top young cops. After foiling a robbery attempt they are promoted to the Narcotic units led by hot-headed police chief Cheung Tit-Man (Simon Yam). Tit-Man is actually Kit's dad, who left him and his mother (Michelle Mai) after shooting her years ago. Kit sees Tit-Man as an enemy and is not so thrilled with having to work under him.

Kit requests a transfer to the internal affairs department, but decides to participate in one last operation where the team tries to take down a major drug lord known as Big Bryan (Ken Tong). During the arrest attempt, Fit Lo is seen letting Bryan go, which costs him his job. Now seemingly on opposite sides of the law, Kit and Fit Lo must try to keep their friendship together. To make things even more complicated Fit Lo is also married to Kit's former love interest and cousin Wing Chi (Gillian Chung).

Cast
Nicholas Tse as Cheung Wai-kit
Edison Chen as Ngai Fung "Fit Lo"
Simon Yam as Cheung Tit-Man
Gillian Chung as Wing Chi 
Lam Suet as Fat Seven
Michelle Yim as Kit's Mother
Roy Chow as Ko Lo Chun
Kent Tong as Big Bryan
Wu An as Ho Jia
Shu Qao as Officer Nichole Sun
David Lee Wai-Seung as Officer Wai Kwok-Ying
Wan Chi Keung as Lai Sir
Samuel Leung Cheuk-Moon as Ronaldo
Roderick Lam Chung-Kei as Little Bryan

Reception
"Moving Targets" was a box office flop in Hong Kong. Even with an noticeable cast involve the movie garnered a lot of negative reviews due to the weak storyline and re-writing of popular characters from the 80's TVB drama series Police Cadet '84 which the movie is based on. Audiences did not like the darker storyline and merging of characters together when compared to the TVB series. Gillian Chung character Wing Chi was a hybrid of Tse Wing Chi and Cheung Ka Man (played by Maggie Cheung and Carina Lau) in the TVB series. Same for Simon Yam character which was a hybrid of characters that were Kit's older half brother and father in the TVB series (played by Andy Dai and Lau Siu Ming).

References

External links 

Love HK film page
rotten tomatoes page

Triad films
2000s Cantonese-language films
Films set in Hong Kong
Films shot in Hong Kong
Hong Kong crime action films
Hong Kong martial arts films
2004 films
2000s crime action films
2000s crime drama films
2004 martial arts films
Police detective films
Films directed by Wong Jing
2004 drama films
2000s Hong Kong films